During the 1999–2000 English football season, Wigan Athletic F.C. competed in the Football League Second Division.

Final league table

Results
Wigan Athletic's score comes first

Legend

Football League Second Division

Second Division play-offs

FA Cup

League Cup

Football League Trophy

References

Wigan Athletic F.C. seasons
Wigan Athletic F.C.